The red beret is a military beret worn by many military, paramilitary, commando, and police forces and should not be confused with the maroon beret worn by airborne troops all around the world.

Military police
Red berets are worn by the military police of many NATO and Commonwealth of Nations militaries.

 Military Police (Russia) - Russian Federation
 Royal Military Police – Provost branch of the British Army
 Royal Australian Corps of Military Police
 Corps of Military Police – India
 Sri Lanka Corps of Military Police
 Canadian Forces Military Police
 MH Katonai Rendészeti Központ (MH KRK) - Hungarian Defence Forces Military Police Center
 Feldjäger – Military Police of the German Bundeswehr
 Royal Military Police – Malaysian Military Police
 Póilíní Airm – Irish Military Police Corps (Ireland)
 Danish Military Police
 Military Police – Kuwait Army
  Namibian Defence Force Military Police 
 Royal Military Police – Jordan Armed Forces
 Sõjaväepolitsei - Estonian Defence Forces
 Militārā policija - Latvian National Armed Forces
 Karo policija - Lithuanian Armed Forces
 Military Police - United Arab Emirates Army
 Military Police - Uganda People's Defence Force (UPDF)

Commando forces

 Special Forces Command (Cambodia) – The Royal Cambodian Special Commando Force
 Angolan Armed Forces Commandos – guerrilla and counter-guerrilla special operations force
 Kopassus – Indonesian Army Special Forces Commandos
 KOPASKA – Indonesian Special Naval Frogmen Command
 Mozambique Special Forces (Commandos) – guerrilla and counter-guerrilla special operations force
 Portuguese Army Commandos – guerrilla and counter-guerrilla special operations force
 Special Brigade – Serbian Special Forces
 Lebanese Commando Regiment – Lebanese special forces regiment tasked with multiple roles
 Special Task and Rescue – Malaysian coast guard counter-terrorist special operations force
 Commando Parachute Group – French Commando Parachute Regiment
 Sri Lanka Army Commando Regiment – One of two Special Operations Forces of the Sri Lanka Army.
 4th Rapid Deployment Brigade (Czech Republic) – One of two Special Operations Forces of the army of the Czech Republic
 601st Special Forces Group – The most elite unit of the Czech army

Paramilitary forces
 Special units of the Internal Troops of the Russian MVD
 JSO (Special Operations Unit) of Serbia
 Rhodesian Ministry of Internal Affairs (Intaf) in the Rhodesian Bush War
 General Service Unit of Kenya
 Ulster Resistance of Northern Ireland

Other military units

The following military units wear red berets:
 The Saudi Arabian National Guard
 The Special Services Group of the Pakistan Army.
 Support troops in the German Bundeswehr (light red – called coral red, maroon only for airborne troops)
 Special Forces Battalion "Wolves" of North Macedonia
 The Austrian Army Guard battalion
 Turkish Army's special forces
 United States Air Force Combat Controller
 United States Air Force Special Tactics Officer
 United States Navy Flying Rifle Drill Team (Senior Drill Master only)
 Syrian Republican Guard
 The 4th Rapid Deployment Brigade and 601st Special Forces Group of the Army of the Czech Republic
 The Republican Guard in the Democratic Republic of the Congo
 The Swedish 32nd Intelligence Battalion
 All Artillery units of the Swiss Armed Forces
 Military Police, Artillery and Anti Aircraft Artillery of the Hungarian Defence Forces

The following military units formerly wore red berets:
 The 1st and 2nd Canadian Infantry Battalions of the 27th Canadian Infantry Brigade in West Germany
 The Hastings and Prince Edward Regiment of Canada,
 The Vietnamese Airborne Division (Mũ Đỏ Nhảy Dù) of the Republic of Vietnam
 40. Fallschirmjägerbataillon Willi Sänger of the former German Democratic Republic's Nationale Volksarmee.
 The 4th Guards Brigade (Croatia) (called "The Spiders", 'Pauci')

Police forces
 Ertzaina – the Police force of the Basque Country
 Policía Foral – the Police force of Navarre
 Federal Reserve Unit of the Royal Malaysia Police
 Cacciatori of the Carabinieri – in English "Hunters", the Italian Gendarmerie special unit operating in Calabria
 Special Operations Command of the Singapore Police Force
 Dog unit of the Public Security Police, Portugal

Carlists
The red beret was worn as a distinguishing device by Carlist Guías de Navarra (Navarre Guides) soldiers in the First Carlist War, encouraged by their commander Tomás de Zumalacárregui. Regular Carlists wore a black beret.  The red beret became widespread amongst the Carlists in the Second Carlist War, it later became an emblem of Carlists in general, often with a yellow pom pom or tassel. See also the Requetés, (Spanish:Hunting callers) a type of volunteer unit during the Spanish Civil War.

The red beret was also worn by the Chapelgorris (Spanish:Red caps) who fought against the Carlists in the First Carlist War.

Non-military
 Guardian Angels, international volunteer organization
 Cadets in the California Cadet Corps who have completed survival training are authorized to wear a red beret with a flash representing their brigade.
 Boy Scouts of America
 Cadets in the Young Army Cadets National Movement Russia
 ORB, a group within Doctor Steel's Army of Toy Soldiers fan club
 Soldier of Fortune magazine uses a red beret as their logo.
 The Economic Freedom Fighters, a South African political party, have adopted the red beret as one of their symbols.
 People Power, Our Power Political Pressure Group in Uganda led by Bobi Wine

Native American Veteran Organizations
 The American Indian Movement, Native American Indians whom were former U.S. military veterans, have adopted the use of the red beret as one of their Native warrior society symbols back in 1970. The Red Beret is also in use by Native American warrior societies and tribal government police, Law Enforcement and by members and veterans of Native American organizations such as the TIMB Taino Indian Movement of Boriken (Puerto Rico).

In popular culture

Films
 The Red Beret (1953)
 The Devil's Brigade (1968)
 The Red Berets (1968)
 The Wild Geese (1978)
 Taps (film) (1981) – worn by B Company, Valley Forge Military Academy and College treated as B Company of Bunker Hill Military Academy, led by Tom Cruise as Cadet Captain David Shawn in the film.

Comic books
 Mlle. Marie
 Fightin' 5
Percy Pinkerton

Others
Mirai Sentai Timeranger (2000-2001) – worn by Naoto Takizawa, played by Shinji Kasahara, as the leader of the City Guardians.
Power Rangers Time Force (2001) – worn by Eric Myers, played by Daniel Southworth, as the leader of the Silver Guardians.
Gundam Build Divers (2018) - the headpiece of the  GH-001RB Grimoire Red Beret, piloted by Rommel.
- worn by the Green M&M on the packaging art of Chocolate M&M's Camoflauge Eggs

See also
 Beret
 Black beret
 Blue beret
 Green beret
 Maroon (color)
 Maroon beret
 Military beret
 Tan beret

Notes

Military uniforms
Hats
Berets